Pathlow may refer to:
Pathlow, Saskatchewan, Canada
Pathlow, Warwickshire, England